Pseudocyba is a monotypic genus of Asian sheet weavers containing the single species, Pseudocyba miracula. It was first described by A. V. Tanasevitch in 1984, and has only been found in Kazakhstan and Russia.

See also
 List of Linyphiidae species (I–P)

References

Linyphiidae
Monotypic Araneomorphae genera
Spiders of Asia
Spiders of Russia